David Evans or Yeuans (by 1523 – 1568), of The Great House, Neath, Glamorgan, was a Welsh politician.

He was a Member (MP) of the Parliament of England for Cardiff Boroughs in March 1553, October 1553, April 1554 and 1559.

References

1568 deaths
16th-century Welsh politicians
People from Neath
Members of the Parliament of England (pre-1707) for constituencies in Wales
English MPs 1553 (Edward VI)
English MPs 1553 (Mary I)
English MPs 1554
English MPs 1559
Year of birth uncertain